John Abraham (born 1972) is a Bollywood actor

John Abraham can also refer to:
 John Abraham (director) (1937–1987), Malayali Indian filmmaker and scriptwriter
 John Abraham (American football) (born 1978), retired NFL defensive end for the New York Jets, Atlanta Falcons, and Arizona Cardinals
 John Abraham (politician) (died 1689), Hudson's Bay Company governor of Port Nelson
 John Abraham (engineer), American mechanical engineering professor at the University of Saint Thomas
 John Braham (tenor) (1774–1856), English vocalist, born John Abraham
 John Abraham, Indian American former mayor of Teaneck, New Jersey

See also 
 John Abrahams (born 1952), South African-born cricketer
 Jon Abrahams (born 1977), American actor
 John Braham (disambiguation)